John Albert Broadus (January 24, 1827 – March 16, 1895) was an American Baptist pastor and President of the Southern Baptist Theological Seminary.

Early life
Born in 1827 in Culpeper County, Virginia, Broadus was educated at home and at a private school. He taught in a small school before completing his undergraduate studies at the University of Virginia in Charlottesville, Virginia.

Career
Broadus was ordained in 1850 and became pastor of the Baptist church in Charlottesville.

In 1859, Broadus along with James P. Boyce, Basil Manly Jr., and William Williams, founded the Southern Baptist Theological Seminary in Greenville, South Carolina.  Broadus became professor of New Testament interpretation and homiletics at the Southern Baptist Theological Seminary. With Manley, Broadus was also one of the first leaders of the Sunday School Board publishing operations.

During the American Civil War, he served as a Confederate chaplain to Robert E. Lee's army in Northern Virginia.

He delivered a lecture at the University of Virginia in memorial to Professor Gessner Harrison in 1873.

In 2018 the President of the Seminary commissioned a "Report on slavery and racisim within the history of the Southern Baptist Seminary"  which found that Broadus and its principal founders combined owned 50 slaves Broadus owning at least two slaves, and the faculty and trustees at the seminary defended the “righteousness of slavery” and supported the Confederacy’s efforts to preserve slavery.  Broadus repudiated American slavery in 1882. In 1883, he delivered an address on the Confederate cause at Louisville's Cave Hill Cemetery. That  was an important part of reunion, as he argued that both sides were partly correct in their positions that led to war.

In 1888, he became Southern Seminary's second president.

In 1889, Broadus delivered the Beecher Lectures at Yale Divinity School.

Broadus died in 1895.

Personal life
Broadus married Maria Carter Harrison on  November 14, 1849. She died October 21, 1857. He remarried, to Charlotte Eleanor Sinclair (1836–1913) on January 4, 1859.

Legacy
Charles Spurgeon called Broadus the "greatest of living preachers." Church historian Albert Henry Newman called Broadus "perhaps the greatest preacher the Baptists have produced."

The official gavel of the Southern Baptist Convention controversially bears the name of Broadus and, in June, 2020, President J.D. Greear proposed the organization "retire the Broadus gavel" "amid nationwide protests around racial injustice that has led to the removal of Confederate statues and symbols." 

The Southern Baptist Theological Seminary, named Broadus chapel, (modeled after the First Baptist Church in America, located in Providence, Rhode Island) in his honor. 

Lottie Moon was converted at an evangelistic meeting led by Broadus in 1858. Broadus had founded the Albemarle Female Institute in which Moon attended and graduated from.

Selected works

 (see James Petigru Boyce)

References

Further reading

David S. Dockery and Roger D. Duke eds., John A. Broadus: A Living Legacy Studies in Baptist Life and Thought, ed. Michael A.G. Haykin.  Nashville:  Broadman and Holman Academic, 2008. 260 pp.

External links

John Albert Broadus Papers
Furman University's Special Collection on Baptists 
Baptist Identity and Christian Higher Education, monograph by Donald D. Schmeltekopf and Dianna M. Vitanza

1827 births
1895 deaths
American slave owners
People from Culpeper County, Virginia
University of Virginia alumni
American Baptist theologians
Confederate States Army chaplains
19th-century Baptist ministers from the United States
Burials at Cave Hill Cemetery
Southern Baptist Theological Seminary presidents
Southern Baptist Theological Seminary faculty
Southern Baptists
Baptists from Virginia
Baptists from Kentucky